New York's 54th State Senate district is one of 63 districts in the New York State Senate. It has been represented by Republican Pamela Helming since 2017, succeeding fellow Republican Michael Nozzolio.

Geography
District 54 covers several counties in the Finger Lakes region, including all of Seneca and Wayne Counties as well as parts of Cayuga, Monroe, Ontario, and Tompkins Counties.

The district overlaps with New York's 24th congressional district and with the 125th, 126th, 130th, 131st, 132nd, and 135th districts of the New York State Assembly.

Recent election results

2020

2018

2016

2014

2012

Federal results in District 54

References

54